Olya Stoichkova (born 19 November 1964) is a Bulgarian rower. She competed in two events at the 1988 Summer Olympics.

References

1964 births
Living people
Bulgarian female rowers
Olympic rowers of Bulgaria
Rowers at the 1988 Summer Olympics
Rowers from Sofia